Aaron Joseph Colnon (August 5, 1870 – December 8, 1936) was an American football player and coach.  He was the fifth head football coach
at Colgate University and he held that position for the 1896 season.  His coaching record at Colgate was 3–4–1.

Colnon played on the Cornell football team from 1889 to 1893. After graduating, he later played with the Duquesne and Crescent Athletic Clubs in New York. Before coaching at Colgate in 1896, he served as an assistant coach at Cornell. He was later a lawyer.

Head coaching record

References

1870 births
1936 deaths
19th-century players of American football
American football guards
Colgate Raiders football coaches
Cornell Big Red football coaches
Cornell Big Red football players
People from Potsdam, New York
Coaches of American football from New York (state)
Players of American football from New York (state)